Themaat is a hamlet in the Dutch province of Utrecht. It is a part of the municipality of Utrecht, and lies about 7 km west of Utrecht.

The hamlet has about 100 inhabitants.

References

Populated places in Utrecht (province)